Ansaldo Poggi was born in Villafontana di Medicina (Bologna), 9 June 1893 and died in Bologna, 4 September 1984.
He demonstrated his talent for the making of stringed instruments at a young age. His father, also an artisan, musician and amateur violinmaker, encouraged his son, steering him toward the arts. 
After the end of World War I he dedicated himself to the profession, taking up the craft again alongside his father while at the same time graduating from the Philharmonic Academy of Bologna. 
In 1921 he met up with the famous luthier Giuseppe Fiorini, of whom he was an adored disciple. In 1923 he won his first silver medal with a viola at the National Competition in Rome. 

In 1925, 1927 and 1929 he was awarded many gold medals, which resulted in his no longer being permitted to compete. 
With the passing of the years Poggi became stylistically independent of Fiorini, and was soon producing instruments of a shape and reflecting a taste all his own. 
He became an enormous success on both a national and international level.

Gian Carlo Guicciardi, Giampaolo Savini and Neldo Ferrari have to be considered his students.

"Ansaldo Poggi is considered by most soloists the greatest violin maker of the 20th century. Most of his instruments are based on Stradivari model, sometimes on Guarneri and a personal model. During his lifetime, he made instruments for important musicians such as Mistislav Rostropovich, David Oistrakh, Nathan Milstein, Yehudi Menuhin, Isaac Stern, Aaron Rosand, and Uto Ughi, to name just a few. Violinist Aaron Rosand, sold his 10 million dollar Joseph Guarnerius violin in 2009 and now performs on an Ansaldo Poggi violin. Poggi made a total of 322 violins in his lifetime."

References

Citations

Bibliography
 
 
Tito Gotti, Bologna 1991 and 1993, 
Paradigmi. Forme nell'Artigianato, Bologna 1988 and 1989
Daniele Benati - Pierluigi Giordani, Stanze bolognesi - La Collezione Lauro, Bologna 1994
Artemio Versari, "Liuteria moderna in Emilia Romagna" 2002
Artemio Versari, "La grande liuteria italiana" 2009
Il Suono di Bologna, Da Raffaele Fiorini ai grandi maestri del Novecento". Catalogo della Mostra nella chiesa di San Giorgio in Poggiale, Bologna 2002. 
Eric Blot, Un secolo di Liuteria Italiana 1860-1960 - A century of Italian Violin Making - Emilia e Romagna I, Cremona 1994. 
Dictionary of 20th Century Italian Violin Makers - Marlin Brinser 1978 
Regazzi Roberto, In occasione del 250º anniversario della morte di Antonio Stradivari per onorare la figura di Giuseppe Fiorini, Maestro Liutaio - Bazzano (Bologna) 1861 - Monaco di Baviera 1934. Una Immagine e una Biografia per celebrare la donazione della Collezione Salabue di Cimeli Stradivariani alla Città di Cremona, Bazzano 1987
The Strad, January 1984 Bologna, a living tradition of Violin Making
 
 
Walter Hamma, Meister Italienischer Geigenbaukunst, Wilhelmshaven 1993,

External links 
 
 
 

Italian luthiers
1893 births
1984 deaths
20th-century Italian musicians
Businesspeople from Bologna